Nuits intimes (Intimate Nights) is the fourth live album by French new wave band, Indochine. It was released on March 6, 2001.

Track listing
 Nuit intime - 1:24
 Les plus mauvaises nuits - 2:01
 Tes yeux noirs - 4:40
 Atomic Sky - 3:51
 D'ici mon amour - 4:10
 Justine - 3:55
 More - 6:12
 Salombo - 3:04
 3 nuits par semaine - 4:37
 7000 danses - 5:27
 Juste toi et moi - 2:51
 A l'est de Java - 3:18
 La colline des roses - 2:01
 Ce soir le ciel - 4:15
 Stef II - 5:33
 Punishment Park - 4:05

References

External links
 Detailed album information at www.indo-chine.org

Indochine (band) albums
2001 live albums